The 2016 Boston Pizza Cup was held from February 10 to 14 at the Encana Arena in Camrose, Alberta. The winning Kevin Koe rink represented Alberta at the 2016 Tim Hortons Brier in Ottawa.  Koe's rink went on to win the Brier, his third Brier championship as skip.

Qualification process
Twelve teams qualified for the provincial tournament through several methods. The qualification process is as follows:

Teams

Knockout Draw Brackets
The draw is listed as follows:

A event

B event

C event

Knockout results

Draw 1
Wednesday, February 10, 9:30 am

Draw 2
Wednesday, February 10, 6:30 pm

Draw 3
Thursday, February 11, 9:00 am

Draw 4
Thursday, February 11, 2:00 pm

Draw 5
Thursday, February 11, 6:30 pm

Draw 6
Friday, February 12, 9:00 am

Draw 7
Friday, February 12, 2:00 pm

Draw 8
Friday, February 6, 6:30 pm

Draw 9
Saturday, February 7, 1:00 pm

Playoffs

A vs. B
Saturday, February 13, 6:30 pm

C1 vs. C2
Saturday, February 13, 6:30 pm

Semifinal
Sunday, February 14, 9:30 am

Final
Sunday, February 14, 2:00 pm

References

External links

Curling in Alberta
2016 Tim Hortons Brier
Sport in Camrose, Alberta
2016 in Alberta
February 2016 sports events in Canada